Leonard Bundu (born 21 November 1974) is a Sierra Leone-born Italian former professional boxer who competed from 2005 to 2016. He held multiple regional welterweight championships, including the European title twice between 2011 and 2016; the European Union title from 2009 to 2010; the Commonwealth title in 2014; and challenged once for the WBA interim welterweight title in 2014. As an amateur, Bundu won a gold medal in the light-welterweight division at the 1997 Mediterranean Games; welterweight bronze at the 1999 World Championships; and represented Italy at the 2000 Olympics, where he reached the second round of the welterweight bracket.

Amateur career
Bundu won his first major amateur medal at the 1997 Mediterranean Games in Bari, winning gold in the light-welterweight division. This was followed up with bronze at the 1999 World Championships in Houston. At the 2000 Olympics in Sydney, Bundu fought in the welterweight division, losing to Daniyar Munaytbasov in the second round. Bundu also represented his native Sierra Leone at the 2nd AIBA African 2004 Olympic Qualifying Tournament in Gaborone, where he won bronze in welterweight division.

Professional career
On 1 April 2005, Bundu won in his professional debut with a first-round knockout against Peter Gaspar. He would spend the next nine years fighting almost exclusively in his adoptive Italy, save for one outing in Germany. During this time Bundu would pick up many regional championships, including the vacant European Union welterweight title on 13 March 2009, in a unanimous decision (UD) over Frank Haroche Horta.

Bundu vs. Petrucci 
This was bettered on 4 November 2011, when Bundu won the full European welterweight title in a rematch against Daniele Petrucci; their first fight for the vacant title, on 25 June 2011, ended in an eighth-round majority technical draw.

Bundu vs. Gavin 
Bundu defended his European title six times, as well as winning the Commonwealth title against undefeated contender and decorated amateur Frankie Gavin. In their fight, on 1 August 2014, Bundu scored a surprise sixth-round knockdown with a hard body shot, and would go on to win by split decision.

Bundu vs. Thurman 
Later in the year, on 13 December, Bundu challenged unsuccessfully for his first major world championship in his first visit to the United States. Defending WBA interim titlist Keith Thurman, also an undefeated prospect at the time, knocked Bundu down in the first round, but Bundu showed his durability by going the full twelve-round distance with the feared puncher. In doing so, Bundu suffered his first professional loss via UD.

Bundu vs. Koivula 
On 22 April 2016, Bundu won the vacant European welterweight title for a second time by stopping Jussi Koivula in nine rounds.

Bundu vs. Spence Jr 
Later that year, on 21 August, Bundu travelled to the US for a third time to face Errol Spence Jr., another undefeated prospect, in what was an eliminator for the IBF welterweight title. The first three rounds were fast-paced and competitive, with Bundu utilising his pressure fighting style and feints, although his punch output would slow in the fourth as Spence began using consistent combinations and lateral movement. In round six, Bundu was floored by a hard uppercut, but this was incorrectly deemed a push by the referee. Seconds later, Spence landed an uppercut–hook combination which left Bundu slumped on the canvas unconscious, in his first knockout loss. He was also stripped of his European welterweight title.

Professional boxing record

References

External links

Leonard Bundu - Profile, News Archive & Current Rankings at Box.Live

1974 births
Sierra Leonean male boxers
Living people
Sportspeople from Freetown
Light-welterweight boxers
Welterweight boxers
Olympic boxers of Italy
Boxers at the 2000 Summer Olympics
Italian male boxers
European Boxing Union champions
Commonwealth Boxing Council champions
Mediterranean Games gold medalists for Italy
Competitors at the 1997 Mediterranean Games
Mediterranean Games medalists in boxing
AIBA World Boxing Championships medalists